Sazaa  is a 2011 Maldivian romantic-drama film directed by Hussain Munnawar. Produced by Hussain Rasheed, the film stars Niuma Mohamed and Lufshan Shakeeb in the lead roles while Ismail Rasheed in the supporting role.

Plot
Reema (Niuma Mohamed), a happy-go-lucky girl while in her island for holidays meets Zaid (Lufshan Shakeeb), a land surveyor from Male'. For them, it's hate at first sight which as predicted turns into love.

But Reema's life is thrown into unpredictability and turmoil when connection to Zaid is mysteriously lost after he leaves to Male’ promising to return within few days. Days turn to weeks and weeks to months. While Reema waits desperately, she sees her life changing unexpectedly as if fate has other plans for her.

Cast
 Lufshan Shakeeb as Zaid
 Niuma Mohamed as Reema
 Ismail Rasheed as Ahammaa
 Fathimath Azifa as Zeena
 Ajnaz Ali as Adil
 Nashidha Mohamed as Zubeidha
 Mariyam Haleem as Faathuma
 Idhris Mohamed as Moosa
 Khadheeja Ahmed as Sofiyya

Soundtrack
The soundtrack for the film includes six songs (including 1 promotional song) with no copy musics included.

Accolades

References

External links
 
 

2011 films
2011 romantic drama films
Maldivian romantic drama films